Makongo (or Bakongo, Bakongoi, Bakongai etc.) is a settlement in the Bas-Uélé province of the Democratic Republic of the Congo.

Location

Makongo is in Bambesa Territory, Bas-Uélé province.
It is on the Makongo River, a tributary of the Bomokandi River, which in turn is a tributary of the Uele River.

Historical

The Italian explorer Giovanni Miani Mangià arrive in Bakongoi on 3 July 1872. 
At this point his escort refused to go further.
Miani stayed at Bakangoi until 16 September 1872.
The sultan was greatly pleased with a present of a looking glass, and told him much about the lands to the south and west.
Based on interviews with the sultan and his subjects Miani drew a sketch map of the region.

Notes

Sources

Populated places in Bas-Uélé